The Catholic Church in Liechtenstein is part of the worldwide Catholic Church, under the spiritual leadership of the Pope in Rome.

Around three quarters of the population is Catholic.  Prior to 1997, the principality was part of the Swiss Diocese of Chur.  In 1997, the Archdiocese of Vaduz was created, covering the whole of the principality.  The first and to date only archbishop is Wolfgang Haas.

See also
 Religion in Liechtenstein

External links
Statistics relating to the Catholic Church in Liechtenstein
 Photo of the cathedral in Vaduz

 
Religion in Liechtenstein
Liechtenstein
Liechtenstein
Religious organizations based in Liechtenstein